Asura camerunensis is a moth of the  subfamily Arctiinae. It is found in Cameroon.

References

Endemic fauna of Cameroon
camerunensis
Insects of Cameroon
Moths of Africa